Cyril VI, lay name Konstantinos Serpetzoglou (Κωνσταντίνος Σερπεντζόγλου) was the Ecumenical Patriarch of Constantinople between the years 1813 and 1818.

He was born in 1769 in Edirne, where he finished school. He was a smart and good student. He was put under the protection of the local metropolitan bishop (and later Ecumenical Patriarch) Callinicus V, who ordained him deacon in 1791 and hired him as a secretary. In 1801, when Cyril was elected Patriarch, he appointed him great archdeacon of the Patriarchate. From that position he was especially occupied with the reorganisation of the Great School of the Nation, which was then moved to Kuruçeşme.

In September 1803 he was elected Metropolitan bishop of Konya, serving as such for seven years. There, he worked hard for the establishment of schools, the funding of impecunious students, the distribution of books and the general education. In 1810 he was moved to the Metropolis of Edirne. On 4 March 1813, after the resignation of Jeremias IV of Constantinople, he was elected Ecumenical Patriarch.

As Ecumenical Patriarch, past the special interest he showed for the development of education, he founded a music school, and published many books, mainly religious. He fixed the economical problems of the Patriarchate and reopened the Patriarchal Press and the Great School of the Nation. It is speculated that he was an advisor of Filiki Eteria. Moreover, it is thought that the Sultan Mahmud II made him resign, which happened on 13 December 1818.

After his resignation he retired to Edirne. When the Greek War of Independence broke out, his name was included in the decree of the Sultan where the command to execute 30 priests and kodjabashis of Edirne was given. He was executed by hanging in the gate of the Metropolis and his body stayed hanging for three days (the first time the rope broke and the Ottomans considered it a superstition) and was later thrown in the Maritsa. Later, his relic was found from a villager and was buried. His grave still exists in the yard of a house in the village of Pythio, next to the Maritsa river.

He was recognised as a saint in 1993 by the Holy Synod of the Church of Greece and he is honored on April 18 or carried on Thomas Sunday. He was canonized by The Ecumenical Patriarchate on February 11 2022.

References

Sources
 Ecumenical Patriarchate
 Cyril, Patriarch of Constantinople
 Holy people of the eparchy of Didymoteichos
 Anexartitos Serron

1769 births
1821 deaths
Eastern Orthodox saints
Bishops of Adrianople
19th-century Ecumenical Patriarchs of Constantinople
People from Edirne
19th-century executions by the Ottoman Empire
People executed by the Ottoman Empire by hanging
Persecution of Christians in the Ottoman Empire
Persecution of Eastern Orthodox Christians
Eastern Orthodox bishops of Iconium
Christian saints killed by Muslims
Burials in Greece